Bangelui (also Romanized as Bangelū’ī; also known as Bangelūee) is a village in Zarabad-e Sharqi Rural District, Zarabad District, Konarak County, Sistan and Baluchestan Province, Iran. At the 2006 census, its population was 110, in 27 families.

References 

Populated places in Konarak County